Haunted Heart may refer to:

"Haunted Heart", a 1948 song by Howard Dietz and Arthur Schwartz from Inside U.S.A., covered by Perry Como and Jo Stafford
Haunted Heart (Ron Squeri album), 2007
Haunted Heart (Renée Fleming album), 2005
Haunted Heart (Sammy Kershaw album), 1993
"Haunted Heart" (song), 1993
Haunted Heart (Charlie Haden album), 1991
"Haunted Heart", a Christina Aguilera song (2019)
Haunted Heart, an album by Jo Stafford, see List of Jo Stafford compilation albums